Flippa is a private marketplace for buying and selling online businesses, based in Melbourne, Australia, and Austin, Texas, United States. It was founded in June 2009 by Mark Harbottle and Matt Mickiewicz.

History 
Flippa was founded by Mark Harbottle and Matt Mickiewicz as the SitePoint Marketplace, and was spun off as a separate website in June 2009. By 2015, it had traded more than $140 million in websites, domains, and mobile apps.

The majority of Flippa's revenue comes from selling online businesses including content sites, SaaS businesses, ecommerce businesses, apps, digital services, marketplaces and more. The most expensive sale to date was a portfolio of Singapore-based apps, which sold for US$35,000,000. The most expensive domain name sold was planetrx.com, selling for US$1,200,000. Other notable websites and domains sold through Flippa have included Mark Zuckerberg's former website Facemash, overnight success story shipyourenemiesglitter.com, Retweet.com, and AllAboutCookies.org. 

During the 2012 US presidential election, the domain name RomneyRyan.com was listed on Flippa. It reached US$8,050 in bids, but did not sell. It dropped in price the next year and was eventually sold through GoDaddy for US$235.00.

In May 2015, Flippa bought Domain Holdings, a domain name brokerage firm based in Florida.

On August 27, 2015, Potato Parcel was sold on Flippa for US$42,000. A few months earlier, the viral website shipyourenemiesglitter.com from creator Matthew Carpentor sold for US$85,000.

On September 20, 2021, Flippa announced a US$11,000,000 Series A capital raise led by Sydney-based venture capital firm OneVentures.

On March 16, 2022, after acquiring Richard Patey's Alts Cafe, Flippa announced the launch of ALTS by Flippa, an alternative asset investing newsletter and Discord community. Written by Richard Patey, the newsletter shines light on "alternative investing opportunities, from online business to crypto & NFTs". As of November 2022, its Discord community boasts over 2000 members.

External links 

 Official website

References

Companies based in Melbourne


